Barrie Norman Lester (born 1982) is an Australian international lawn and indoor bowler.

Bowls career

World Championship
In 2016 he was part of the triples team with Aron Sherriff and Mark Casey who won the silver medal at the 2016 World Outdoor Bowls Championship in Christchurch and won another silver medal in the fours.

In 2020 he was selected for the 2020 World Outdoor Bowls Championship in Australia.

Commonwealth Games
Lester won a bronze medal in the pairs with Nathan Rice at the 2006 Commonwealth Games in Melbourne.

Further success came as part of the Australian team for the 2018 Commonwealth Games on the Gold Coast in Queensland where he won two silver medals in the Triples and the Fours.

In 2022, he competed in the men's triples and the men's fours at the 2022 Commonwealth Games. Lester, along with Carl Healey and Ben Twist won the silver medal.

Asia Pacific
Lester won double gold at the 2019 Asia Pacific Bowls Championships in the Gold Coast, Queensland.

Other
In 2012, he won the Hong Kong International Bowls Classic singles title. At national level he has won one Australian National Bowls Championships title and one Australian Open.

References

1982 births
Australian male bowls players
Bowls players at the 2006 Commonwealth Games
Bowls players at the 2018 Commonwealth Games
Bowls players at the 2022 Commonwealth Games
Commonwealth Games medallists in lawn bowls
Commonwealth Games silver medallists for Australia
Commonwealth Games bronze medallists for Australia
Living people
20th-century Australian people
21st-century Australian people
Medallists at the 2006 Commonwealth Games
Medallists at the 2018 Commonwealth Games
Medallists at the 2022 Commonwealth Games